Oryzias is a genus of ricefishes native to fresh and brackish water in east and south Asia. Some species are widespread and the Japanese rice fish (O. latipes) is commonly used in science as a model organism, while others have very small ranges and are threatened.

The genus name Oryzias is a reference to the scientific name for rice, Oryza.

They have an unusual reproductive behavior where the female facultatively  (optionally) carries the eggs in a cluster at the pelvic or  anal fins for a period after they have been fertilized.

Species

There are currently 33 recognized species in this genus:
 Oryzias asinua Parenti, Hadiaty, Lumbantobing & Herder, 2013
 Oryzias bonneorum Parenti, 2008
 Oryzias carnaticus Jerdon, 1849
 Oryzias celebensis M. C. W. Weber, 1894 (Celebes medaka)
 Oryzias curvinotus Nichols & C. H. Pope, 1927
 Oryzias dancena F. Hamilton, 1822
 Oryzias eversi Herder, Hadiaty & Nolte, 2012
 Oryzias hadiatyae Herder & Chapuis, 2010 (Renny's ricefish)
 Oryzias haugiangensis T. R. Roberts, 1998
 Oryzias hubbsi T. R. Roberts, 1998
 Oryzias javanicus Bleeker, 1854 (Javanese ricefish)
 Oryzias latipes Temminck & Schlegel, 1846 (Japanese ricefish)
 Oryzias luzonensis Herre & Ablan, 1934
 Oryzias marmoratus Aurich, 1935 (Marmorated medaka)
 Oryzias matanensis Aurich, 1935 (Matano medaka)
 Oryzias mekongensis Uwa & Magtoon, 1986
 Oryzias melastigma McClelland, 1839
 Oryzias minutillus H. M. Smith, 1945 (Dwarf medaka)
 Oryzias nebulosus Parenti & Soeroto, 2004
 Oryzias nigrimas Kottelat, 1990 (black buntingi)
 Oryzias orthognathus Kottelat, 1990 (Sharp-jawed buntingi)
 Oryzias pectoralis T. R. Roberts, 1998
 Oryzias profundicola Kottelat, 1990 (Yellow finned medaka)
 Oryzias sakaizumii T. Asai, Senou & K. Hosoya, 2012 (Northern medaka)
 Oryzias sarasinorum Popta, 1905 (Sarasins minnow)
 Oryzias setnai Kulkarni, 1940 (Malabar ricefish)
 Oryzias sinensis Y. R. Chen, Uwa & X. L. Chu, 1989
 Oryzias soerotoi D. F. Mokodongan, Tanaka & Yamahira, 2014
 Oryzias songkhramensis Magtoon, 2010
 Oryzias timorensis M. C. W. Weber & de Beaufort, 1922
 Oryzias uwai T. R. Roberts, 1998
 Oryzias wolasi Parenti, Hadiaty, Lumbantobing & Herder, 2013
 Oryzias woworae Parenti & Hadiaty, 2010
 Oryzias dopingdopingensis Ixchel F. Mandagi, Daniel Frikli Mokodongan, Tanaka & Yamahira, 2018

References

 
Adrianichthyidae
Taxa named by David Starr Jordan
Taxa named by John Otterbein Snyder
Taxonomy articles created by Polbot